Samuel Brown House may refer to:

Samuel Brown House (West Richwoods, Arkansas), listed on the National Register of Historic Places in Stone County, Arkansas
Samuel Brown House (Roachdale, Indiana), listed on the National Register of Historic Places in Putnam County, Indiana
Samuel A. Brown House, Newton, Kansas, listed on the NRHP in Kansas
Samuel N. Brown House, Dayton, Ohio, listed on the NRHP in Ohio
P. Samuel Brown House, Fulton, Ohio, listed on the NRHP in Ohio
Sam Brown House, Gervais, Oregon, listed on the NRHP in Oregon